Sorin Petcu (born April 1, 1974) is a Romanian sprint canoer who competed in the 1990s. He won three medals at the ICF Canoe Sprint World Championships with two silvers (K-4 200 m and K-4 500 m: both 1994) and a bronze (K-4 1000 m: 1999).

Petcu also competed in two Summer Olympics, earning his best finish of fifth in the K-4 1000 m event at Barcelona in 1992.

References

Sports-reference.com profile

1974 births
Canoeists at the 1992 Summer Olympics
Canoeists at the 2000 Summer Olympics
Living people
Olympic canoeists of Romania
Romanian male canoeists
ICF Canoe Sprint World Championships medalists in kayak